Seabiscuit was a champion Thoroughbred racehorse in the United States.

Seabiscuit or sea biscuit may also refer to:

 Hardtack, a hard type of edible beaten biscuit
 Seabiscuit: An American Legend, a 2001 book by Laura Hillenbrand about the horse of the same name
 Seabiscuit (film), a 2003 film based on the book
 Sea biscuit (echinoderm), (Clypeaster) a genus of echinoderms 
 Sea Biscuit, a 1994 album by Spacetime Continuum
 Sea biscuit, several species of sand dollar sea urchins
 Nickname of Max Seibald (born 1987), American lacrosse player
 Nickname of Jimmy Wilkes (1925–2008), American baseball player

See also
 Biscuit, an inflatable ring towed behind a boat in tubing
 Biscuit (disambiguation)
 The Story of Seabiscuit, a 1949 American drama film directed by David Butler starring Shirley Temple